Donaghey ( or Dún Eachaidh) is a small village and townland roughly halfway between Cookstown and Dungannon, just off the A29, in County Tyrone, Northern Ireland.

Donaghey has a range of facilities including a congregational church, a community hall, a primary school and a post office.

Education
Donaghey Primary School

Religion 
Donaghey Congregational Church

Donaghey townland
The townland is situated in the historic barony of Dungannon Middle and the civil parish of Donaghenry and covers an area of 258 acres.

The population of the townland declined during the 19th century:

See also 
List of villages in Northern Ireland
List of townlands of County Tyrone

References

Donaghey Congregational Church Website
Donaghey on Google Maps

Villages in County Tyrone
Townlands of County Tyrone
Barony of Dungannon Middle